Edith Helena Adie (1865–1947) was a British painter known for her watercolours.

Biography
Adie was born on 27 December 1865 in the Streatham section of London. She was a student at the South Kensington Art School, the Westminster School of Art and the Slade School of Fine Art. She painted landscapes and garden scenes in Taormina and Bordighera Italy. Adie also traveled to Australia. She exhibited at the New Society of Painters in Water Colours and the Royal Academy of Arts between 1893 and 1912 and also with the Royal Society of British Artists.  She was a member of the British Watercolour Society.

Adie died on 16 May 1947 in Tonbridge.

Gallery

References

Further reading
 Dictionary of British Artists Working 1900–1950 by Grant M. Waters, 1975, published by Eastbourne Fine Art, 
 The Dictionary of British Women Artists by Sara Gray, 2009, published by The Lutterworth Press, 
 A History and Dictionary of British Flower Painters 1650-1950 by Josephine Walpole, 2006, published by The Antique Collectors' Club,

External links
 

1865 births
1947 deaths
19th-century English women artists
20th-century English women artists
19th-century English painters
20th-century English painters
Alumni of the Royal College of Art
Alumni of the Slade School of Fine Art
Alumni of the Westminster School of Art
Artists from London
English women painters
People from Streatham